Sason rameshwaram is a species of spider in the family Barychelidae, found in India.

References

Barychelidae
Spiders described in 2009
Spiders of the Indian subcontinent
Endemic fauna of India